Faringdon Abbey was a Cistercian abbey located at Wyke just north of the small town of Faringdon in the English county of Berkshire (now Oxfordshire).

The Royal manor of Faringdon was given to the Cistercian monks by King John in 1203 for the founding of an abbey. It was built at Wyke, a lost placename that was located just north of the town between the Radcot Road and Grove Wood. It was almost certainly never finished for the abbey moved to Beaulieu in the New Forest in the following year. Faringdon, however, remained under the monks' control and the abbey site became one of their monastic granges.

References

Monasteries in Oxfordshire
Monasteries in Berkshire
Cistercian monasteries in England
1203 establishments in England
Christian monasteries established in the 13th century
Faringdon